Qian Zhenhua (born September 1, 1979, in Shanghai) is a male Chinese modern pentathlete who competed in the 2000 Summer Olympics, in the 2004 Summer Olympics and also in the 2008 Summer Olympics.

In 2000, he finished 24th in the men's competition.

Four years later, he finished 16th in the men's competition.

He won the gold medal of the individual event at the 2005 World Modern Pentathlon Championships.

He made great improvement and finished 4th in the men's competition at the 2008 Summer Olympics.

References

External links
 

1979 births
Living people
Chinese male modern pentathletes
Modern pentathletes at the 2000 Summer Olympics
Modern pentathletes at the 2004 Summer Olympics
Modern pentathletes at the 2008 Summer Olympics
Olympic modern pentathletes of China
Sportspeople from Shanghai
Asian Games medalists in modern pentathlon
Modern pentathletes at the 2002 Asian Games
World Modern Pentathlon Championships medalists
Asian Games silver medalists for China
Asian Games bronze medalists for China
Medalists at the 2002 Asian Games
20th-century Chinese people
21st-century Chinese people